Christopher Paul James (born 4 July 1987) is a professional football player who currently plays for Klubi 04 in the Kakkonen, the third highest level of the Finnish football league system. He is also the assistant coach of HJK Helsinki's U14 team.

James represented New Zealand at international level. James is predominantly a central midfielder or deep-lying playmaker, but is also able to play very well in offensive roles.

Club career
James' first professional contract was with Premier League side Fulham. Although he never made a senior first-team appearance, he made many appearances for the reserve side. James was offered a one-year contract extension by Fulham in 2007, however James declined the offer to pursue first team opportunities elsewhere.

In February 2008, he signed a two-year contract with Tampere United. Even though the 2008 season wasn't a very successful one for his team, James debut season was impressive, in 17 league games he scored three goals and also provided eight assists in his breakthrough season. He represented Tampere United in their four Champions League Qualifiers scoring two goals.

James was signed by Football League Two side Barnet in March 2010 on a free transfer subject to international clearance. James made his first team debut as a late substitute in a 3–1 home victory over Chesterfield on 5 April 2010. James was released at the end of the season due to change of management at Barnet.

After his departure from his third Finnish side FC Haka, James was signed by second-tier American club Colorado Springs Switchbacks F.C. on a free transfer on 12 January 2017. He was officially released from the club after making only four appearances due to injuries on 27 July 2017

On 19 November 2017, he returned to New Zealand and played for Eastern Suburbs AFC of ISPS Handa Premiership

On 9 March 2018, he moved to Finland for KTP of Ykkönen. After he arrived to the team, he played 90 mins and scored in the next day versus PEPO Lappeenranta in 2017–18 Finnish Cup

Later career
In January 2019, James received his UEFA B Coaching Licence. As part of his personal development, James reached out to New Zealand national under-20 football team head coach Des Buckingham, to join the preparation camp in the lead up to the FIFA U-20 World Cup where he helped the coaching staff out. Before that, he also picked up coaching experience at the academies of West Bromwich Albion and Arsenal.

In November 2019 it was confirmed, that James would play for Klubi 04, the reserve team of HJK Helsinki. Beside that, he would also function as an assistant coach to the club's U14 team.

International career
James played for the England youth team representing them over 30 times at Under 16–18 levels but has now chosen to play for the country of his birth, New Zealand. Ricki Herbert included him in the All Whites squad just days after receiving international clearance to play for New Zealand for the friendly match against then-World Champions Brazil on 5 June 2006, which they lost 4–0. He has made a number of appearances for his country since his debut, playing the likes of Charlton Athletic and Sevilla in friendlies. He also scored a consolation goal against Sevilla which was calmly slotted away.

Impressive performances in these matches has won him the New Zealand Soccer International Young Men's Player of the Year award for 2006. He was a member of the New Zealand under-20 team that qualified for the under-20 World Cup in Canada, scoring seven goals in six games including a hat-trick against Samoa. It was the first time New Zealand had a team qualify for the under-20 world cup.

James was named as part of the 2009 FIFA Confederations Cup New Zealand squad to travel to South Africa, but was not named in New Zealand's 2010 FIFA World Cup squad.

James returned to the national side for the 2013 OSN Cup.

International goals
Scores and results list New Zealand's goal tally first.

References

External links

Player profile on Veikkausliiga's official site
Player profile on Tampere United's official site
James on NZFootball.co.nz

1987 births
Living people
New Zealand association footballers
New Zealand international footballers
New Zealand expatriate association footballers
New Zealand people of English descent
Association footballers from Wellington City
Fulham F.C. players
Tampere United players
Barnet F.C. players
APIA Leichhardt FC players
FC Haka players
Colorado Springs Switchbacks FC players
FC Ilves players
Ekenäs IF players
Kotkan Työväen Palloilijat players
Kuopion Palloseura players
CS Sedan Ardennes players
Eastern Suburbs AFC players
Klubi 04 players
Veikkausliiga players
Kakkonen players
Ykkönen players
Championnat National 2 players
USL Championship players
English Football League players
Association football midfielders
2008 OFC Nations Cup players
2009 FIFA Confederations Cup players
Expatriate footballers in England
Expatriate footballers in Finland
Expatriate footballers in France
Expatriate soccer players in the United States
New Zealand expatriate sportspeople in England
New Zealand expatriate sportspeople in Finland
New Zealand expatriate sportspeople in France
New Zealand expatriate sportspeople in the United States